Aïn Touta District is a district of Batna Province, Algeria.

Municipalities
The district further divides into four municipalities:

Aïn Touta
Ben Foudhala El Hakania
Maâfa
Ouled Aouf

References 

Districts of Batna Province